Little Churchill River/Dunlop's Fly In Lodge Aerodrome  is located in Northern Manitoba, Canada. It is on Waskaiowaka Lake, the source of the Little Churchill River, at the point where the river leaves the lake.

References

Registered aerodromes in Manitoba